HMS Onslow was an  built for the Royal Navy during the First World War. She took part in the Battle of Jutland in 1916 and was sold for scrap in 1921.

Description
The Admiralty M class were improved and faster versions of the preceding . They displaced . They were powered by three Parsons direct-drive steam turbines, each driving one propeller shaft, using steam provided by four Yarrow boilers. The ships' complement was 76 officers and ratings.

The ships were armed with three single QF  Mark IV guns and two QF 1.5-pounder (37 mm) anti-aircraft guns. These latter guns were later replaced by a pair of QF 2-pounder (40 mm) "pom-pom" anti-aircraft guns. The ships were also fitted with two above water twin mounts for  torpedoes.

Construction and service
Onslow was ordered under the Third War Programme in November 1914 and built by Fairfield Shipbuilding & Engineering Company at Govan. The ship was launched on 15 February 1916 and completed in April 1916. Her first commander was John Tovey, (later Admiral of the Fleet).

On 24 April 1916, the Easter Rising against British rule broke out in Ireland. Two infantry brigades were ordered from Liverpool to Dublin to reinforce the British forces, with Onslow escorting the transports carrying these troops. Tovey pressed home the attack against first a cruiser and then a line of battlecruisers. Onslow was brought back to Aberdeen despite the damage, having been towed out of action by the destroyer , under heavy fire. The report on the battle by Admiral Beatty stated that:

 Both officers were awarded DSOs.

Onslow was sold for breaking up on 26 October 1921.

Notes

Bibliography

External links 

 Battle of Jutland Crew Lists Project - HMS Onslow Crew List

 

Admiralty M-class destroyers
Ships built on the River Clyde
1916 ships
World War I destroyers of the United Kingdom